The alkaline earth metals are six chemical elements in group 2 of the periodic table. They are beryllium (Be), magnesium (Mg), calcium (Ca), strontium (Sr), barium (Ba), and radium (Ra). The elements have very similar properties: they are all shiny, silvery-white, somewhat reactive metals at standard temperature and pressure.

Structurally, they (together with helium) have in common an outer s-orbital which is full—
that is, this orbital contains its full complement of two electrons, which the alkaline earth metals readily lose to form cations with charge +2, and an oxidation state of +2. Helium itself is a noble gas and not an alkaline earth metal, though it is theorised to have some similarities to beryllium when forced into bonding and has sometimes been suggested to belong to group 2.

All the discovered alkaline earth metals occur in nature, although radium occurs only through the decay chain of uranium and thorium and not as a primordial element. There have been experiments, all unsuccessful, to try to synthesize element 120, the next potential member of the group.

Characteristics

Chemical 
As with other groups, the members of this family show patterns in their electronic configuration, especially the outermost shells, resulting in trends in chemical behavior:

Most of the chemistry has been observed only for the first five members of the group. The chemistry of radium is not well-established due to its radioactivity; thus, the presentation of its properties here is limited.

The alkaline earth metals are all silver-colored and soft, and have relatively low densities, melting points, and boiling points. In chemical terms, all of the alkaline earth metals react with the halogens to form the alkaline earth metal halides, all of which are ionic crystalline compounds (except for beryllium chloride, beryllium bromide and beryllium iodide, which are covalent). All the alkaline earth metals except beryllium also react with water to form strongly alkaline hydroxides and, thus, should be handled with great care. The heavier alkaline earth metals react more vigorously than the lighter ones. The alkaline earth metals have the second-lowest first ionization energies in their respective periods of the periodic table because of their somewhat low effective nuclear charges and the ability to attain a full outer shell configuration by losing just two electrons. The second ionization energy of all of the alkaline metals is also somewhat low.

Beryllium is an exception: It does not react with water or steam, and its halides are covalent. If beryllium did form compounds with an ionization state of +2, it would polarize electron clouds that are near it very strongly and would cause extensive orbital overlap, since beryllium has a high charge density. All compounds that include beryllium have a covalent bond. Even the compound beryllium fluoride, which is the most ionic beryllium compound, has a low melting point and a low electrical conductivity when melted.

All the alkaline earth metals have two electrons in their valence shell, so the energetically preferred state of achieving a filled electron shell is to lose two electrons to form doubly charged positive ions.

Compounds and reactions 
The alkaline earth metals all react with the halogens to form ionic halides, such as calcium chloride, as well as reacting with oxygen to form oxides such as strontium oxide. Calcium, strontium, and barium react with water to produce hydrogen gas and their respective hydroxides (magnesium also reacts, but much more slowly), and also undergo transmetalation reactions to exchange ligands.

{| class="wikitable sortable"
|+ Alkaline earth metals fluorides solubility-related constants
! Metal
! M2+HE
! F−HE
! "MF2"unitHE
! MF2latticeenergies
! Solubility
|-
| Be
| 2,455
| 458
| 3,371
| 3,526
| soluble
|-
| Mg
| 1,922
| 458
| 2,838
| 2,978
| 0.0012
|-
| Ca
| 1,577
| 458
| 2,493
| 2,651
| 0.0002
|-
| Sr
| 1,415
| 458
| 2,331
| 2,513
| 0.0008
|-
| Ba
| 1,361
| 458
| 2,277
| 2,373
| 0.006
|}

Physical and atomic 

The table below is a summary of the key physical and atomic properties of the alkaline earth metals.

Nuclear stability 

Of the six alkaline earth metals, beryllium, calcium, barium, and radium have at least one naturally occurring radioisotope; magnesium and strontium do not. Beryllium-7, beryllium-10, and calcium-41 are trace radioisotopes; calcium-48 and barium-130 only decay by double beta decay and have very long half-lives (longer than the age of the universe) and are thus primordial radionuclides; and all isotopes of radium are radioactive. Calcium-48 is the lightest nuclide to undergo double beta decay. Calcium and barium are weakly radioactive: calcium contains about 0.1874% calcium-48, and barium contains about 0.1062% barium-130. The longest lived isotope of radium is radium-226 with a half-life of 1600 years; it and radium-223, -224, and -228 occur naturally in the decay chains of primordial thorium and uranium. Beryllium-8 is notable by its absence as it nigh instantaneously decays into two alpha particles whenever it is formed. The triple alpha process in stars can only occur at energies high enough for beryllium-8 to encounter a third alpha particle before it decays. This is why most main sequence stars spend billions of years hydrogen burning but never or only briefly during their red giant phase initiate helium burning. Strontium-90 is a common fission product of the fission of uranium and has been produced in appreciable quantities by humanmade nuclear reactions as well as a tiny secular equilibrium concentration in uranium due to spontaneous fission. Radioisotopes of alkaline earth metals are usually "bone seekers" as they behave chemically similar to calcium and may do significant harm to bone marrow (a rapidly dividing tissue) when they accumulate there. This property is also made use of in radiotherapy of certain bone cancers as the chemical properties allow the radionuclide to target the cancerous growth in the bone while leaving the rest of the body unharmed.

Compared to their neighbors in the periodic table, alkaline earth metals tend to have more stable isotopes, as they possess an even number of protons and for any given even mass number, isobars with both an even number of protons and an even number of neutrons tend to be more stable due to nucleon pairing effects.

History

Etymology 

The alkaline earth metals are named after their oxides, the alkaline earths, whose old-fashioned names were beryllia, magnesia, lime, strontia, and baria. These oxides are basic (alkaline) when combined with water. "Earth" was a term applied by early chemists to nonmetallic substances that are insoluble in water and resistant to heating—properties shared by these oxides. The realization that these earths were not elements but compounds is attributed to the chemist Antoine Lavoisier. In his Traité Élémentaire de Chimie (Elements of Chemistry) of 1789 he called them salt-forming earth elements. Later, he suggested that the alkaline earths might be metal oxides, but admitted that this was mere conjecture. In 1808, acting on Lavoisier's idea, Humphry Davy became the first to obtain samples of the metals by electrolysis of their molten earths, thus supporting Lavoisier's hypothesis and causing the group to be named the alkaline earth metals.

Discovery 

The calcium compounds calcite and lime have been known and used since prehistoric times. The same is true for the beryllium compounds beryl and emerald. The other compounds of the alkaline earth metals were discovered starting in the early 15th century. The magnesium compound magnesium sulfate was first discovered in 1618 by a farmer at Epsom in England. Strontium carbonate was discovered in minerals in the Scottish village of Strontian in 1790. The last element is the least abundant: radioactive radium, which was extracted from uraninite in 1898.

All elements except beryllium were isolated by electrolysis of molten compounds. Magnesium, calcium, and strontium were first produced by Humphry Davy in 1808, whereas beryllium was independently isolated by Friedrich Wöhler and Antoine Bussy in 1828 by reacting beryllium compounds with potassium. In 1910, radium was isolated as a pure metal by Curie and André-Louis Debierne also by electrolysis.

Beryllium 

Beryl, a mineral that contains beryllium, has been known since the time of the Ptolemaic Kingdom in Egypt. Although it was originally thought that beryl was an aluminium silicate, beryl was later found to contain a then-unknown element when, in 1797, Louis-Nicolas Vauquelin dissolved aluminium hydroxide from beryl in an alkali. In 1828, Friedrich Wöhler and Antoine Bussy independently isolated this new element, beryllium, by the same method, which involved a reaction of beryllium chloride with metallic potassium; this reaction was not able to produce large ingots of beryllium. It was not until 1898, when Paul Lebeau performed an electrolysis of a mixture of beryllium fluoride and sodium fluoride, that large pure samples of beryllium were produced.

Magnesium 

Magnesium was first produced by Humphry Davy in England in 1808 using electrolysis of a mixture of magnesia and mercuric oxide. Antoine Bussy prepared it in coherent form in 1831. Davy's first suggestion for a name was magnium, but the name magnesium is now used.

Calcium 

Lime has been used as a material for building since 7000 to 14,000 BCE, and kilns used for lime have been dated to 2,500 BCE in Khafaja, Mesopotamia. Calcium as a material has been known since at least the first century, as the ancient Romans were known to have used calcium oxide by preparing it from lime. Calcium sulfate has been known to be able to set broken bones since the tenth century. Calcium itself, however, was not isolated until 1808, when Humphry Davy, in England, used electrolysis on a mixture of lime and mercuric oxide, after hearing that Jöns Jakob Berzelius had prepared a calcium amalgam from the electrolysis of lime in mercury.

Strontium 

In 1790, physician Adair Crawford discovered ores with distinctive properties, which were named strontites in 1793 by Thomas Charles Hope, a chemistry professor at the University of Glasgow, who confirmed Crawford's discovery. Strontium was eventually isolated in 1808 by Humphry Davy by electrolysis of a mixture of strontium chloride and mercuric oxide. The discovery was announced by Davy on 30 June 1808 at a lecture to the Royal Society.

Barium 

Barite, a mineral containing barium, was first recognized as containing a new element in 1774 by Carl Scheele, although he was able to isolate only barium oxide. Barium oxide was isolated again two years later by Johan Gottlieb Gahn. Later in the 18th century, William Withering noticed a heavy mineral in the Cumberland lead mines, which are now known to contain barium. Barium itself was finally isolated in 1808 when Humphry Davy used electrolysis with molten salts, and Davy named the element barium, after baryta. Later, Robert Bunsen and Augustus Matthiessen isolated pure barium by electrolysis of a mixture of barium chloride and ammonium chloride.

Radium 

While studying uraninite, on 21 December 1898, Marie and Pierre Curie discovered that, even after uranium had decayed, the material created was still radioactive. The material behaved somewhat similarly to barium compounds, although some properties, such as the color of the flame test and spectral lines, were much different. They announced the discovery of a new element on 26 December 1898 to the French Academy of Sciences. Radium was named in 1899 from the word radius, meaning ray, as radium emitted power in the form of rays.

Occurrence 

Beryllium occurs in the earth's crust at a concentration of two to six parts per million (ppm), much of which is in soils, where it has a concentration of six ppm. Beryllium is one of the rarest elements in seawater, even rarer than elements such as scandium, with a concentration of 0.2 parts per trillion. However, in freshwater, beryllium is somewhat more common, with a concentration of 0.1 parts per billion.

Magnesium and calcium are very common in the earth's crust, being respectively the fifth- eighth-most-abundant elements. None of the alkaline earth metals are found in their elemental state.  Common magnesium-containing minerals are carnallite, magnesite, and dolomite.  Common calcium-containing minerals are chalk, limestone, gypsum, and anhydrite.

Strontium is the fifteenth-most-abundant element in the Earth's crust. The principal minerals are celestite and strontianite. Barium is slightly less common, much of it in the mineral barite.

Radium, being a decay product of uranium, is found in all uranium-bearing ores. Due to its relatively short half-life, radium from the Earth's early history has decayed, and present-day samples have all come from the much slower decay of uranium.

Production 

Most beryllium is extracted from beryllium hydroxide. One production method is sintering, done by mixing beryl, sodium fluorosilicate, and soda at high temperatures to form sodium fluoroberyllate, aluminium oxide, and silicon dioxide. A solution of sodium fluoroberyllate and sodium hydroxide in water is then used to form beryllium hydroxide by precipitation. Alternatively, in the melt method, powdered beryl is heated to high temperature, cooled with water, then heated again slightly in sulfuric acid, eventually yielding beryllium hydroxide. The beryllium hydroxide from either method then produces beryllium fluoride and beryllium chloride through a somewhat long process. Electrolysis or heating of these compounds can then produce beryllium.

In general, strontium carbonate is extracted from the mineral celestite through two methods: by leaching the celestite with sodium carbonate, or in a more complicated way involving coal.

To produce barium, barite (impure barium sulfate) is converted to barium sulfide by carbothermic reduction (such as with coke). The sulfide is water-soluble and easily reacted to form pure barium sulfate, used for commercial pigments, or other compounds, such as barium nitrate. These in turn are calcined into barium oxide, which eventually yields pure barium after reduction with aluminium. The most important supplier of barium is China, which produces more than 50% of world supply.

Applications 

Beryllium is used mainly in military applications, but non-military uses exist. In electronics, beryllium is used as a p-type dopant in some semiconductors, and beryllium oxide is used as a high-strength electrical insulator and heat conductor. Beryllium alloys are used for mechanical parts when stiffness, light weight, and dimensional stability are required over a wide temperature range. Beryllium-9 is used in small-scale neutron sources that use the reaction  , the reaction used by James Chadwick when he discovered the neutron. Its low atomic weight and low neutron absorption cross section would make beryllium suitable as a neutron moderator, but its high price and the readily available alternatives such as water, heavy water and nuclear graphite have limited this to niche applications. In the FLiBe eutectic used in molten salt reactors, beryllium's role as a moderator is more incidental than the desired property leading to its use.

Magnesium has many uses. It offers advantages over other structural materials such as aluminium, but magnesium's usage is hindered by its flammability. Magnesium is often alloyed with aluminium, zinc and manganese to increase it strength and corrosion resistance. Magnesium has many other industrial applications, such as its role in the production of iron and steel, and in the Kroll process for production of titanium.

Calcium is used as a reducing agent in the separation of other metals such as uranium from ore. It is  a major component of many alloys, especially aluminium and copper alloys, and is also used to deoxidize alloys. Calcium has roles in the making of cheese, mortars, and cement.

Strontium and barium have fewer applications than the lighter alkaline earth metals. Strontium carbonate is used in the manufacturing of red fireworks. Pure strontium is used in the study of neurotransmitter release in neurons. Radioactive strontium-90 finds some use in RTGs, which utilize its decay heat. Barium is used in vacuum tubes as a getter to remove gases. Barium sulfate has many uses in the petroleum industry, and other industries.

Radium has many former applications based on its radioactivity, but its use is no longer common because of the adverse health effects and long half-life. Radium was frequently used in luminous paints, although this use was stopped after it sickened workers.  The nuclear quackery that alleged health benefits of radium formerly led to its addition to drinking water, toothpaste, and many other products. Radium is no longer used even when its radioactive properties are desired because its long half-life makes safe disposal challenging. For example, in brachytherapy, short half-life alternatives such as iridium-192 are usually used instead.

Representative reactions of alkaline earth metals

Reaction with halogens
Ca + Cl2 → CaCl2
Anhydrous calcium chloride is a hygroscopic substance that is used as a desiccant. Exposed to air, it will absorb water vapour from the air, forming a solution. This property is known as deliquescence.

Reaction with oxygen
Ca + 1/2O2 → CaO
Mg + 1/2O2 → MgO

Reaction with sulphur
Ca + 1/8S8 → CaS

Reaction with carbon

With carbon, they form acetylides 
directly. Beryllium forms carbide.

2Be + C → Be2C
CaO + 3C → CaC2 + CO (at 2500 °C in furnace)
CaC2 + 2H2O → Ca(OH)2 + C2H2
Mg2C3 + 4H2O → 2Mg(OH)2 + C3H4

Reaction with nitrogen

Only Be and Mg form nitrides directly.
3Be + N2 → Be3N2
3Mg + N2 → Mg3N2

Reaction with hydrogen

Alkaline earth metals react with hydrogen to generate saline hydride that are unstable in water.
Ca + H2 → CaH2

Reaction with water

Ca, Sr and Ba readily react with water to form hydroxide and hydrogen gas. Be and Mg are passivated by an impervious layer of oxide. However, amalgamated magnesium will react with water vapour.
Mg + H2O → MgO + H2

Reaction with acidic oxides

Alkaline earth metals reduce the nonmetal from its oxide.
2Mg + SiO2 → 2MgO + Si
2Mg + CO2 → 2MgO + C (in solid carbon dioxide)

Reaction with acids
Mg + 2HCl → MgCl2 + H2
Be + 2HCl → BeCl2 + H2

Reaction with bases

Be exhibits amphoteric properties. It dissolves in concentrated sodium hydroxide.
Be + NaOH + 2H2O → Na[Be(OH)3] + H2

Reaction with alkyl halides

Magnesium reacts with alkyl halides via an insertion reaction to generate Grignard reagents.
RX + Mg → RMgX (in anhydrous ether)

Identification of alkaline earth cations

The flame test

The table below presents the colours observed when the flame of a Bunsen burner is exposed to salts of alkaline earth metals. Be and Mg do not impart colour to the flame due to their small size.

In solution

Mg2+

Disodium phosphate is a very selective reagent for magnesium ions and, in the presence of ammonium salts and ammonia, forms a white precipitate of ammonium magnesium phosphate. 
Mg2+ + NH3 + Na2HPO4 → (NH4)MgPO4 + 2Na+

Ca2+

Ca2+ forms a white precipitate with ammonium oxalate. Calcium oxalate is insoluble in water, but is soluble in mineral acids.
Ca2+ + (COO)2(NH4)2 → (COO)2Ca + NH4+

Sr2+

Strontium ions precipitate with soluble sulphate salts.
Sr2+ + Na2SO4 → SrSO4 + 2Na+

All ions of alkaline earth metals form white precipitate with ammonium carbonate in the presence of ammonium chloride and ammonia.

Compounds of alkaline earth metals

Oxides

The alkaline earth metal oxides are formed from the thermal decomposition of the corresponding carbonates.
CaCO3 → CaO + CO2 (at approx. 900°C)
In laboratory, they are obtained from hydroxides:
Mg(OH)2 → MgO + H2O
or nitrates:
Ca(NO3)2 → CaO + 2NO2 + 1/2O2
The oxides exhibit basic character: they turn phenolphthalein red and litmus, blue. They react with water to form hydroxides in an exothermic reaction.
CaO + H2O → Ca(OH)2 + Q
Calcium oxide reacts with carbon to form acetylide.
CaO + 3C → CaC2 + CO (at 2500°C)
CaC2 + N2 → CaCN2 + C
CaCN2 + H2SO4 → CaSO4 + H2N—CN
H2N—CN + H2O → (H2N)2CO (urea)
CaCN2 + 2H2O → CaCO3 + NH3

Hydroxides

They are generated from the corresponding oxides on reaction with water. They exhibit basic character: they turn phenolphthalein pink and litmus, blue. Beryllium hydroxide is an exception as it exhibits amphoteric character.
Be(OH)2 + 2HCl → BeCl2 + H2O
Be(OH)2 + NaOH → Na[Be(OH)3]

Salts

Ca and Mg are found in nature in many compounds such as dolomite, aragonite, magnesite (carbonate rocks).
Calcium and magnesium ions are found in hard water. Hard water represents a multifold issue. It is of great interest to remove these ions, thus softening the water. This procedure can be done using reagents such as calcium hydroxide, sodium carbonate or sodium phosphate. A more common method is to use ion-exchange aluminosilicates or ion-exchange resins that trap Ca2+ and Mg2+ and liberate Na+ instead:
Na2O·Al2O3·6SiO2 + Ca2+ → CaO·Al2O3·6SiO2 + 2Na+

Biological role and precautions 

Magnesium and calcium are ubiquitous and essential to all known living organisms. They are involved in more than one role, with, for example, magnesium or calcium ion pumps playing a role in some cellular processes, magnesium functioning as the active center in some enzymes, and calcium salts taking a structural role, most notably in bones.

Strontium plays an important role in marine aquatic life, especially hard corals, which use strontium to build their exoskeletons. It and barium have some uses in medicine, for example "barium meals" in radiographic imaging, whilst strontium compounds are employed in some toothpastes. Excessive amounts of strontium-90 are toxic due to its radioactivity and strontium-90 mimics calcium (i.e. Behaves as a "bone seeker") where it bioaccumulates with a significant biological half life. While the bones themselves have higher radiation tolerance than other tissues, the rapidly dividing bone marrow does not and can thus be significantly harmed by Sr-90. The effect of ionizing radiation on bone marrow is also the reason why acute radiation syndrome can have anemia-like symptoms and why donation of red blood cells can increase survivability.

Beryllium and radium, however, are toxic. Beryllium's low aqueous solubility means it is rarely available to biological systems; it has no known role in living organisms and, when encountered by them, is usually highly toxic. Radium has a low availability and is highly radioactive, making it toxic to life.

Extensions 

The next alkaline earth metal after radium is thought to be element 120, although this may not be true due to relativistic effects. The synthesis of element 120 was first attempted in March 2007, when a team at the Flerov Laboratory of Nuclear Reactions in Dubna bombarded plutonium-244 with iron-58 ions; however, no atoms were produced, leading to a limit of 400 fb for the cross-section at the energy studied. In April 2007, a team at the GSI attempted to create element 120 by bombarding uranium-238 with nickel-64, although no atoms were detected, leading to a limit of 1.6 pb for the reaction. Synthesis was again attempted at higher sensitivities, although no atoms were detected. Other reactions have been tried, although all have been met with failure.

The chemistry of element 120 is predicted to be closer to that of calcium or strontium instead of barium or radium. This noticeably contrasts with periodic trends, which would predict element 120 to be more reactive than barium and radium. This lowered reactivity is due to the expected energies of element 120's valence electrons, increasing element 120's ionization energy and decreasing the metallic and ionic radii.

The next alkaline earth metal after element 120 has not been definitely predicted. Although a simple extrapolation using the Aufbau principle would suggest that element 170 is a congener of 120, relativistic effects may render such an extrapolation invalid. The next element with properties similar to the alkaline earth metals has been predicted to be element 166, though due to overlapping orbitals and lower energy gap below the 9s subshell, element 166 may instead be placed in group 12, below copernicium.

See also 
 Alkaline earth octacarbonyl complexes

Explanatory notes

References

Bibliography

Further reading 
 Group 2 – Alkaline Earth Metals, Royal Chemistry Society.
 Hogan, C. Michael. 2010. "Calcium". A. Jorgensen, C. Cleveland, eds. Encyclopedia of Earth. National Council for Science and the Environment.
 Maguire, Michael E. "Alkaline Earth Metals". Chemistry: Foundations and Applications. Ed. J. J. Lagowski. Vol. 1. New York: Macmillan Reference USA, 2004. 33–34. 4 vols. Gale Virtual Reference Library. Thomson Gale.
 Petrucci R.H., Harwood W.S., and Herring F.G., General Chemistry (8th edition, Prentice-Hall, 2002)
 Silberberg, M.S., Chemistry: The Molecular Nature of Matter and Change (3rd edition, McGraw-Hill, 2009)

 
Groups (periodic table)
Periodic table